IISP or variant may refer to:

Institute of Information Security Professionals, an organization for advancing the professionalism of information security practitioners
Citation IISP, business jet
Gulfstream IISP, business jet